Katrin Hoffmann (born 5 July 1978) is a German rhythmic gymnast. She competed in the women's group all-around event at the 1996 Summer Olympics.

References

External links
 

1978 births
Living people
German rhythmic gymnasts
Olympic gymnasts of Germany
Gymnasts at the 1996 Summer Olympics
Sportspeople from Stuttgart
20th-century German women
21st-century German women